Glen Cove Road (also known as Guinea Woods Road) is a , major north–south thoroughfare running through north-central Nassau County on Long Island, New York, in the United States. 

It is the main road leading to the communities on the east shore of Hempstead Harbor. The portion south of the North Hempstead–Oyster Bay town line is the unsigned County Route 1 (CR 1), while the portion north of the town line until its intersection with NY 107 is designated as New York State Route 900B (NY 900B), an unsigned reference route, New York State Route 107 (NY 107), and County Route 243 (CR 243), an unsigned county route.

The northern segment of the highway encompasses the Glen Cove Arterial Highway (also known as Pratt Boulevard), a limited-access highway that was intended to connect to a proposed bridge across the Long Island Sound to Connecticut.

Route description
Glen Cove Road was once signed as Nassau County Route 1 until all county route numbers were removed in the 1970s.

The alignment of Glen Cove Road starts at Peninsula Boulevard in downtown Hempstead as, but is known as Clinton Street in Hempstead and Clinton Road in Garden City until its intersection with Old Country Road in Carle Place.  It curves from when it intersects with NY 25 to I-495 to steer clear of the Meadowbrook Parkway and the Northern Parkway. Within Old Westbury the road is concurrently signed as Guinea Woods Road.

Soon after its intersection with NY 25A in Greenvale, it widens to a divided highway and assumes the NY 900B designation, although the reference markers refer to it as NY 904. At its intersection with NY 107 the alignment assumes that route's number and name.  After another  the divided highway alignment and the NY 107 designation forks to the left as Pratt Boulevard, while Cedar Swamp Road forks to the right as a surface street. The road eventually ends at its intersection with Glen Cove Avenue near downtown Glen Cove.

History
Glen Cove Road was once (as of 1959) part of an extended County Route 1, which reached as far south as Point Lookout and as far north as Centre Island. The current state designation for the route only includes the Clinton Road and Glen Cove Road alignment south of the North Hempstead/Oyster Bay town line, after which it becomes NY 900B and later NY 107 and CR 243. Route 900B had originally been NY 904 prior to the creation of the modern reference route system. The county route signage was removed in the mid-1970s because the county did not want to pay to replace the signs to conform to new federal standards.

The northernmost segment of NY 107, known as the Glen Cove Arterial Highway, was constructed in the mid-1960s. Built as a bypass of Glen Street, it would have served as the approach for the cancelled Rye-Glen Cove Bridge - one of two proposed bridges to connect Rye, New York with Long Island, via. the Long Island Sound.

The bridge carrying Glen Cove Road over the Long Island Expressway was named the Police Officer Michael J. Califano Memorial Bridge, in honor of a police officer who was killed nearby on the line of duty.

Major intersections

Notes
 Upper mileage is based on the entire length of Glen Cove Road (via Google Maps), while lower mileage based on NYSDOT records of NY 900B.

See also

List of county routes in Nassau County, New York
New York State Route 107

References

External links

Roads on Long Island
Transportation in Nassau County, New York